The Hotel Le Royal is a hotel located Daun Penh District, Phnom Penh, Cambodia. It was first established in 1929. It is today operated by the Raffles Hotels & Resorts.

History 

In late 1923 and early 1924, the construction of a 55-room hotel in Phnom Penh was proposed, with Ernest Hébrard as architect, with the help of Jean Desbois for the design. A visionary planner, he played no small part in turning a Cambodian-French colonial outpost into a bustling and dynamic metropolis.

The Phnom Penh proposal also outlined the construction of 40-room hotels in Siem Reap and Hué (Vietnam). The tourist potential of the Angkor ruins had not gone unnoticed. Included in the initial proposal were preliminary estimates for buildings and furnishings for five sites. Costs were presented in the currency of Indochina at the time, the ‘piastre’ or Indochina dollar. It is evident that the highest priority was given to the future hotel for Phnom Penh.

An integral part of Hébrard’s plan was to partially fill in a canal that encircled Phnom Penh’s European Quarter, plant extensive gardens, extend the city to the other side of the Tonle Sap River, create a new central market and, construct a new hotel to be managed by the Society for Grand Hotels of Indochina.

The official opening, attended by HM Sisowath Monivong (reigned 1927-1941) and a host of expatriate guests took place on the evening of 20 November 1929. The party included a lavish buffet, dancing and performances by an orchestra brought especially from what was then Saigon. The Director of the hotel between 1929 and 1931 was M.L.F. de la Pousardière. On 22 December 1931, L’Echo du Cambodge announced the departure of M La Pousardière and a new direction for Le Royal under the supervision of M. Jean Baluteig.

Today, the street immediately alongside the hotel bears the name of the King, Preah Monivong Boulevard. The original name of the street in front of the hotel has changed several times through the years. Originally Avenue du Maréchal Joffre, it became Pologne Street (Street 92) and is now known as Rukhak Vithei Daun Penh. 

The hotel itself has had several name changes. From its inception in 1929 it was named ‘Le Royal’. Between 1970 and 1975, during the Khmer Republic period, it was known simply as ‘Le Phnom’ and was a popular refuge for journalists covering the Cambodian Civil War. In April 1975 the Red Cross sought to establish the hotel as a neutral zone, however with the Fall of Phnom Penh on 17 April 1975 the Khmer Rouge emptied the hotel and its grounds. After the fall of the Khmer Rouge in 1979, it was reopened as ‘Hotel Samakki’ (Solidarity Hotel). This name was used until HM King Father Norodom Sihanouk was reinstalled in 1993 when the hotel reverted once again to ‘Hotel Le Royal’.

References

Literature

External links 
Raffles Hotel Le Royal Official Website
Al Jazeera War Hotels A haven from the civil war, Cambodia’s Hotel Le Phnom

Hotels in Cambodia
Buildings and structures in Phnom Penh
Raffles Hotels & Resorts
Hotels established in 1929
Hotel buildings completed in 1929